Fister may refer to:

People
 Barbara Fister (born 1954), an American author, blogger, and librarian
 Carl Fister, a former Austrian-American soccer center forward 
 Doug Fister (born 1984), an American professional baseball pitcher
 Edward Fister (1911-2003), an American pioneer in electrical engineering 
 Peter Fister, a politician of the late 1700s in Slovenia, Holy Roman Empire

Places
Fister, a village in Hjelmeland municipality in Rogaland county, Norway
Fister Church, a church in Hjelmeland municipality in Rogaland county, Norway
Fister (municipality), a former municipality in Rogaland county, Norway

Other
 FiSTer, a forward observer in the U.S. military

See also
 Pfister (disambiguation)